Charles George Taylor (21 November 1816 – 10 September 1869) was an English cricketer in the mid-19th century who played, as an amateur, mainly for Sussex and Marylebone Cricket Club (MCC), having begun his career at Cambridge University.

Taylor was educated at Eton and Emmanuel College, Cambridge. He was a good all-rounder who batted right-handed and bowled right-arm slow, roundarm style. He was the first captain of Sussex, appointed when the club was founded in 1839 and holding the post until 1846.
 
Taylor made his known debut in the 1836 season and had 125 known appearances in major matches to the 1859 season.  He scored 3088 runs with an average of 14.29 and a highest innings of 114, which was one of two centuries he achieved.  He took 69 catches and 287 wickets with a best tally of eight in one innings.  He is known to have taken 10 wickets in a match on six occasions.

References

1816 births
1869 deaths
People educated at Eton College
Alumni of Emmanuel College, Cambridge
English cricketers of 1826 to 1863
Marylebone Cricket Club cricketers
Sussex cricket captains
Gentlemen cricketers
Petworth cricketers
Cambridge Town Club cricketers
Cambridge University cricketers
Gentlemen of England cricketers
Oxford and Cambridge Universities cricketers
Gentlemen of Sussex cricketers
Fast v Slow cricketers
Nicholas Felix's XI cricketers